SVHS most often refers to:
S-VHS—Super VHS video cassette system

It can also be used to refer to the following preparatory schools:

 Springvale House in Mashonaland East, Zimbabwe

It can also be used as an abbreviation for the following high schools:

 Scotts Valley High School in Scotts Valley, California
 Seneca Valley High School in Germantown, Maryland
 Shades Valley High School in Irondale, Alabama
 Shelby Valley High School in Pike County, Kentucky
 Shepaug Valley High School in Washington, Connecticut
 Simi Valley High School in Simi Valley, California
 Smithson Valley High School in Spring Branch, Texas
 Star Valley High School in Afton, Wyoming
 St. Vincent de Paul High School in Petaluma, California
 Sky View High School in Smithfield, Utah
 Smoky Valley High School in Lindsborg, Kansas
 Sonoma Valley High School in Sonoma, California
 South View High School in Hope Mills, North Carolina
 Symmes Valley High School in Willow Wood, Ohio
 Saint Viator High School in Arlington Heights, Illinois
 Susquehanna Valley High School in Conklin, New York